The 2017 Supertaça de Angola (30th edition) was contested by Primeiro de Agosto, the 2016 Girabola champion and Recreativo do Libolo, the 2016 cup winner. Primeiro de Agosto won the match, making it its 8th super cup win.

Match details

See also
 2016 Angola Cup
 2017 Girabola
 2017 Primeiro de Agosto season
 2017 Recreativo do Libolo season

References

Supertaça de Angola
Super Cup